("Song of the Heart of Jesus"), WAB 144, is the second of two motets of Anton Bruckner's St. Florian period, which is of uncertain authorship. If Bruckner was the composer, it was composed presumably in 1845-1846.

History 
If Bruckner was the composer, he composed the motet in 1845–46 during his stay in St. Florian Abbey. The text is a hymn to the Sacred Heart.

The motet was first published in band II/2, pp. 11–12 of the Göllerich/Auer biography.

Text

Music 
The work of 24-bar in B-flat major, which is scored for mixed choir and organ, contains two short passages for tenor and bass soloists, and soprano soloist, respectively, and ends with an organ postlude.

Discography 
There are only 2 recordings:
 Dan-Olof Stenlund, Malmö Kammarkör, Bruckner: Ausgewählte Werke – CD: Malmö Kammarkör MKKCD 051, 2004
 Thomas Kerbl, Chorvereinigung Bruckner 2011, Anton Bruckner: Lieder / Magnificat – CD: LIVA 046, 2011

References

Sources 
 August Göllerich, Anton Bruckner. Ein Lebens- und Schaffens-Bild,  – posthumous edited by Max Auer by G. Bosse, Regensburg, 1932
 Anton Bruckner – Sämtliche Werke, Band XXI: Kleine Kirchenmusikwerke, Musikwissenschaftlicher Verlag der Internationalen Bruckner-Gesellschaft, Hans Bauernfeind and Leopold Nowak (Editor), Vienna, 1984/2001
 Cornelis van Zwol, Anton Bruckner 1824–1896 – Leven en werken, uitg. Thoth, Bussum, Netherlands, 2012.

External links 
 
 Herz Jesu-Lied B-Dur, WAB 144 (um 1845/46?) Critical discography by Hans Roelofs 
 Live performances of the motet
 Ó Jézus éltem fénye by Márta Bálint conducting the Érsekcsanádi Összhang Kórus 
 Ó, Jézus éltem fénye by Bettina Torgyik conducting the Choir of the Újpest Baptist Church, Budapest (16 April 2017)   - with additional string accompaniment 

Motets by Anton Bruckner
1846 compositions
Compositions in B-flat major
Bruckner: spurious and doubtful works